The year 2022 is the 12th year in the history of the ONE Championship, a mixed martial arts, kickboxing, Muay Thai and submission grappling promotion based in Singapore.

List of events

ONE Championship

ONE on Prime Video

Road to ONE

Grand Prix

2021/22 Kickboxing Featherweight Grand Prix

ONE Kickboxing Featherweight Grand Prix bracket

1Marat Grigorian contracted COVID-19 and could not participate in the semi-finals of the Grand Prix. He was subsequently replaced by Jo Nattawut.

Muay Thai Flyweight Grand Prix

ONE Muay Thai Flyweight Grand Prix bracket

1Jonathan Haggerty was forced to pull out of his bout with Goncalve due to health issue and could not participate in the quarter-finals of the Grand Prix. He was subsequently replaced by Josue Cruz.

2Rodtang Jitmuangnon was forced to pull out due to not providing a hydration test sample and was not able to weigh in. He was subsequently replaced by Panpayak Jitmuangnon.

Kickboxing Heavyweight Grand Prix

ONE Kickboxing Heavyweight Grand Prix bracket

Title fights

ONE Championship: Heavy Hitters

ONE Championship: Heavy Hitters (also known as ONE 150: Xiong vs. Miura) was a Combat sport event held by ONE Championship on January 14, 2022, at the Singapore Indoor Stadium in Kallang, Singapore.

Background
The event was headlined by a Women's Strawweight championship bout between reigning Champion Xiong Jingnan and challenger Ayaka Miura.

The co main event was set to feature a kickboxing title fight, the reigning ONE Kickboxing Light Heavyweight Champion Roman Kryklia was set to defend his title against Murat Aygün. The two were originally scheduled to fight at ONE Championship: Big Bang last year. However, in turn, Aygün has to withdraw on January 12 due to COVID-19, the bout was cancelled for the second time.

Filipino fighter Jeremy Miado and Robin Catalan will not be taking part in  the upcoming event due to COVID-19. 
The pinoys opponents will thus face each other instead. Catalan, will return to action after a year against Elipitua Siregar on the card.

Bonus awards:

The following fighters were awarded bonuses:
$50,000 Performance of the Night: Ekaterina Vandaryeva, Senzo Ikeda, Saygid Izagakhmaev

Results

Road to ONE: Mongolia

Road to ONE: Mongolia was a Combat sport event held by ONE Championship on January 20, 2022, at the Steppe Arena in Ulaanbataar, Mongolia.

Background

Fight Card

ONE Championship: Only the Brave

ONE Championship: Only the Brave (also known as ONE  151: Sitthichai vs. Kiria, Nattawut vs. Allazov)  was a Combat sport event held by ONE Championship on January 28, 2022, at the Singapore Indoor Stadium in Kallang, Singapore.

Background
The main event was set to feature an interim Heavyweight title fight between the Russian Anatoly Malykhin and the Belarusian Kiril Grishenko. However, the bout was canceled and moved to ONE Championship: Bad Blood.

The event also featured the semi finals for the ONE Kickboxing Featherweight Grand Prix.

Francesko Xhaja made his promotional debut against the veterant Rade Opacic.

A Lightweight bout between Zhang Lipeng and Ruslan Emilbek Uulu was scheduled for the event.

Bonus awards:

The following fighters were awarded bonuses:
$50,000 Performance of the Night: Chingiz Allazov, Rade Opacic, Zhang Lipeng.

Results

ONE Championship: Bad Blood

ONE Championship: Bad Blood (also known as ONE  152: Malykhin vs. Grisheko) was a Combat sport event held by ONE Championship on February 11, 2022, at the Singapore Indoor Stadium in Kallang, Singapore.

Background
Bibiano Fernandes was scheduled to make his second ONE bantamweight title defense against John Lineker in the main event. However, Lineker tested positive for COVID days before the event and the bout was pulled. The interim Heavyweight title fight between the Russian Anatoly Malykhin and the Belarusian Kiril Grishenko was promoted to the main event.

Former ONE Flyweight Muay Thai Champion Jonathan Haggerty will make his return to action when he faces #4-ranking Flyweight Muay Thai Mongkolpetch Petchyindee Academy.

A strawweight bout between Yosuke Saruta and Gustavo Balart was planned for the event. However, Saruta tested positive for COVID days before the event and the bout will be rescheduled to ONE 156.

A welterweight fight between Ken Hasegawa and Murad Ramazanov was scheduled for ONE: Bad Blood Hasegawa was injured and out of his clash with Murad Ramazanov, the bout is set to be rebooked.

The Filipina fighter Jenelyn Olsim was set to faces Jihin Radzuan of Malaysia in a women's atomweight bout. However, a two days before the event, Olsim withdrew from the bout, reportedly because she has suffered an injury during her training. She was replaced by Mei Yamaguchi.

Bonus awards:

The following fighters were awarded bonuses:
$50,000 Performance of the Night: Jonathan Haggerty, Woo Sung Hoon

Results

ONE Championship: Full Circle

ONE Championship: Full Circle (also known as ONE  153: De Ridder vs. Abbasov) was a Combat sport event held by ONE Championship on February 25, 2022, at the Singapore Indoor Stadium in Kallang, Singapore.

Background
A ONE Middleweight World Championship bout between reigning champion Reinier de Ridder and title challenger Kiamrian Abbasov was scheduled as the main event. Two additional title fights were later added as well: a ONE Kickboxing Light Heavyweight Championship bout between the champion Roman Kryklia and challenger Murat Aygun, as well as a  ONE Muay Thai Featherweight Championship between champion Petchmorakot Petchyindee and challenger Jamal Yusupov.

Jamal Yusupov and David Branch, but the two veterans have been forced to withdraw from their respective matchups.

Bonus awards:

The following fighters were awarded bonuses:
$50,000 Performance of the Night: Reinier de Ridder, Roman Kryklia

Results

ONE Championship: Lights Out

ONE Championship: Lights Out (also known as ONE  154: Le vs. Tonon) was a Combat sport event held by ONE Championship on March 11, 2022, at the Singapore Indoor Stadium in Kallang, Singapore.

Background
A ONE Featherweight Championship title bout between champion Thanh Le and title challenger Garry Tonon was scheduled as the main event.

ONE Bantamweight World Champion Bibiano Fernandes defends his belt against top-ranked contender John Lineker, and newly crowned ONE Strawweight Muay Thai World Champion Prajanchai PK.Saenchai makes his first title defense against #3-ranked Joseph Lasiri.

Bonus awards:

The following fighters were awarded bonuses:
$50,000 Performance of the Night: Thanh Le, John Lineker, Zhang Peimian, Iman Barlow, Liam Nolan

Results

Road to ONE: Utrecht

Road to ONE: Utrecht was a Kickboxing event held by ONE Championship, the last of 8 4-men tournaments making up the last 32 and last 16 of the Road to One kickboxing tournament in collaboration with 1MMA, sanctioned by Vechtsport Organisatie Nederland (VON) and supported by Global Association of Mixed Martial Arts (GAMMA), on March 12, 2022, at the WFL Studio in Utrecht, Netherlands.

Background
The event will feature a 4-man heavyweight qualification tournament to earn a sport in the Road to one Europe tournament.

Results

ONE Championship: X

ONE Championship: X (also known as ONE  155: Lee vs. Stamp, ONE 155: X and ONE 155: X, 10 YEARS) was a Combat sport event held by ONE Championship on March 26, 2022, at the Singapore Indoor Stadium in Kallang, Singapore.

Background
On 27 October 2021, CEO Chatri Sityodtong broke the news that ONE: X would be postponed to early 2022, owing to a recent surge in the COVID-19 pandemic in Singapore. The event was later rescheduled for March 26, 2022.

It was announced that ONE Flyweight World Grand Prix Champion Demetrious Johnson had signed on to compete at ONE X against ONE Muay Thai Flyweight Champion Rodtang Jitmuangnon in a special rules fight. The contest was set for four, three-minute rounds alternating between Muay Thai and MMA rules. The fight started under Muay Thai rules and switched to MMA for the following rounds.

Stamp Fairtex challenged ONE Atomweight Champion Angela Lee in the headlining bout for the 10th anniversary card with return to full attendance in Singapore.

Adriano Moraes defended the ONE Flyweight Championship against #2-ranked Yuya Wakamatsu.

ONE Bantamweight Muay Thai World Champion Nong-O Gaiyanghadao was scheduled to defend his title against former ONE Bantamweight Kickboxing World Champion Alaverdi Ramazanov. Because of the 2022 Russian invasion of Ukraine, Ramazanov was replaced with the Brazilian Felipe Lobo.

John Wayne Parr faced former ONE Lightweight World Champion Eduard Folayang in retirement Wushu vs. Muay Thai legends fight.

Shinya Aoki and Yoshihiro Akiyama faced one another at ONE X in a clash of Japanese MMA legends.

Capitan Petchyindee defended the ONE Bantamweight Kickboxing Championship against #2-ranked bantamweight kickboxer Hiroki Akimoto.

Four years since they first fought, Superbon Banchamek defended his ONE Featherweight Kickboxing Championship title against #1-ranked Marat Grigorian.

Eight years since they first fought, the #3-ranked Sitthichai Sitsongpeenong rematched the #4-ranked Chingiz Allazov for the Featherweight Kickboxing Grand Prix Final.

Top Filipino strawweights Lito Adiwang and Jeremy Miado faced each other at this event. A rematch between Seo Hee Ham and Denice Zamboanga was also booked for the event. A featherweight fight between Amir Khan and Ryogo Takahashi was added to the ONE: X card.

Reinier de Ridder and Andre Galvao met in a submission grappling match. The American Danielle Kelly made her debut at ONE X in an atomweight submission grappling match against Japanese veteran Mei Yamaguchi.

Nieky Holzken was scheduled to face Islam Murtazaev in a fight between two top lightweight Kickboxing contenders. Shoko Sato was to meet Yusup Saadulaev in a battle of formerly ranked bantamweight contenders. The card also featured Ryuto Sawada and Senzo Ikeda, who meet in a strawweight contest. However, due to the 2022 Russian invasion of Ukraine, all Russian athletes were removed from the card as a result of the Singaporean government banning them from entering the country. As a result, Murtazaev was replaced by Sinsamut Klinmee and Yusup Saadulaev was replaced by Stephen Loman.

Alyse Anderson was scheduled to fight with Indian striker Asha Roka. However, the bout did not materialize.

An atomweight fight between Itsuki Hirata and Jihin Radzuan was added to the card.

Bonus awards:

The following fighters were awarded bonuses:
$50,000 Performance of the Night: Angela Lee, Yoshihiro Akiyama, John Wayne Parr, Hiroki Akimoto, Tang Kai, Sinsamut Klinmee, Kang Ji Won, Danielle Kelly

Results

Grand Finale

Part II

Part I

Road to ONE: RUF 46

Road to ONE: RUF 46 was a Combat sport event held by ONE Championship in partnership with RUF Nation on March 26, 2022, at the Celebrity Theatre in Phoenix, Arizona, United States.

Background
The event featured the semi-finals for the Road to ONE RUF MMA Heavyweight tournament, with the champion receiving a US$100,000+ contract to compete in ONE Championship.

Results

ONE 156: Eersel vs. Sadikovic

ONE Championship 156: Eersel vs. Sadikovic was a Combat sport event held by ONE Championship on April 22, 2022, at the Singapore Indoor Stadium in Kallang, Singapore.

Background
The event was headlined by a ONE Kickboxing Lightweight Championship bout between the reigning champion Regian Eersel and title challenger Arian Sadikovic.

The Co-main Event Jackie Buntan and Smilla Sundell challenged for the inaugural ONE Women's Strawweight Muay Thai Championship.

A strawweight MMA clash between #1-ranked Bokang Masunyane and #2-ranked Jarred Brooks has been added to the event.

Former WBC and WMC Muay Thai World Champion Liam Harrison faced "Elbow Zombie" Muangthai PK.Saenchai in a bantamweight Muay Thai showdown. and Opening the lead card was a strawweight mixed martial arts bout between Namiki Kawahara and Danial Williams.

Marcus Almeida returns to action against Oumar Kane.

A Strawweight bout between former ONE Strawweight Champion Yosuke Saruta and Gustavo Balart was expected to take place at ONE: Bad Blood in February, but Saruta withdraw from the bout due to tested positive for COVID-19. The pairing was rebooked for this event.

A kickboxing light heavyweight bout between former SUPERKOMBAT Super Cruiserweight Champion Andrei Stoica and Giannis Stoforidis was scheduled for the event.

A Women's Atomweight Muay Thai bout between Former Glory Women's Super Bantamweight Championship Anissa Meksen and Estonian phenom Marie Ruumet was scheduled for the event.

A Women's Strawweight bout between former Women's Strawweight title Challenger Ayaka Miura and Dayane Cardoso was scheduled for the event.

Mikey Musumeci is to compete against Japanese MMA veteran Masakazu Imanari this bout was a Submission Grappling match.

Bonus awards:

The following fighters were awarded bonuses:

$50,000 Performance of the Night: Mikey Musumeci, Liam Harrison x2, Smilla Sundell, Regian Eersel

Results

Road to ONE: RUF 47

Road to ONE: RUF 47 was a Combat sport event held by ONE Championship in partnership with RUF Nation on May 14, 2022, at the Celebrity Theatre in Phoenix, Arizona, USA.

Background
The event featured the final for the Road to ONE RUF MMA Heavyweight tournament, with the champion receiving a US$100,000+ contract to compete in ONE Championship.

Results

ONE 157: Petchmorakot vs. Vienot

ONE Championship 157: Petchmorakot vs. Vienot was a Combat sport event held by ONE Championship on May 20, 2022, at the Singapore Indoor Stadium in Kallang, Singapore.

Background
A ONE Muay Thai Featherweight Championship bout between the champion Petchmorakot Petchyindee Academy and current SUPERKOMBAT World Middleweight Champion Jimmy Vienot (also former Lumpinee Stadium middleweight champion) was booked as the main event.

A ONE Muay Thai Strawweight Championship bout between the champion Prajanchai P.K.Saenchai and title challenger Joseph Lasiri was expected to take place at ONE: Lights Out but it was postponed due to Lasiri getting injury during his training camp. They met at this event instead scheduled as the co-main event.

The quarter-finals bouts of the ONE Muay Thai Flyweight Grand Prix were held during the event.

A ONE Flyweight Muay Thai Grand Prix bout between current ONE Flyweight Muay Thai Champion Rodtang Jitmuangnon and Jacob Smith was expected to take place at ONE on TNT 1 in last April, but Smith withdraw from the bout due to injury. The pairing was rebooked for this event.

Jonathan Haggerty was set to face Walter Goncalves in the quarter-finals of the ONE Muay Thai Flyweight Grand Prix. However, Haggerty was forced to pull out of his bout with Goncalves at the last minute due to health issue. Haggerty was replaced in his tournament quarter-finals against Goncalves by Josue Cruz, who had been set to compete in a Grand Prix alternate bout against Panpayak Jitmuangnon earlier in the card.

A heavyweight bout between Marcus Almeida and Hugo Cunha was expected for the main card. However, Cunha tested positive for COVID-19 before the event and was replaced by Jasur Mirzamukhamedov. However, Mirzamukhamedov tested positive for COVID-19 After traveling to Singapore. the bout will be rescheduled for Buchecha and expected to return to action at ONE 158.

Two lightweight submission grappling matches were announced for the event: between Garry Tonon and Tye Ruotolo, as well as between Shinya Aoki and Kade Ruotolo.

A Women's Atomweight bout between Alyse Anderson and Asha Roka was scheduled for ONE: X. However, Anderson withdraw from the bout due to medical resons. The pairing was rebooked for this event.

Bonus awards:

The following fighters were awarded bonuses:

$50,000 Performance of the Night: Tye Ruotolo, Rodtang Jitmuangnon, Joseph Lasiri, Petchmorakot Petchyindee

Results

ONE 158: Tawanchai vs. Larsen

ONE Championship 158: Tawanchai vs. Larsen was a Combat sport event held by ONE Championship on June 3, 2022, at the Singapore Indoor Stadium in Kallang, Singapore.

Background
A ONE Strawweight Championship title bout between champion Joshua Pacio and title challenger Jarred Brooks was scheduled as the main event. The bout was later postponed, as Brooks withdrew with an injury. A featherweight muay thai bout between Tawanchai P.K. Saenchaimuaythaigym and Niclas Larsen was promoted from co-main to main event in its stead.

An atomweight bout between Jenelyn Olsim and Julie Mezabarba was announced for the event.

Bonus awards:

The following fighters were awarded bonuses:

$50,000 Performance of the Night: Alex Silva, Fabricio Andrade, Tawanchai P.K.Saenchai

Results

ONE 159: De Ridder vs. Bigdash

ONE Championship 159: De Ridder vs. Bigdash was a Combat sport event held by ONE Championship on July 22, 2022, at the Singapore Indoor Stadium in Kallang, Singapore.

Background
A ONE Middleweight Championship bout between current champion Reinier de Ridder and former champion Vitaly Bigdash headlined the event.

An interim ONE Muay Thai Women's Atomweight Championship bout between the ONE Kickboxing Atomweight World champion Janet Todd and Lara Fernandez was booked as the co-main event.

Fight card update:

A Lightweight Muay Thai bout between Sinsamut Klinmee and Islam Murtazaev was expected to take place at the event. However, Murtazaev withdraw due to a family emergency and was replaced by Liam Nolan.

A Women's Atomweight Submission grappling rematch between 2018 Asian Games gold medalist in Jujitsu and 2019 Southeast Asian Games gold medalist in Jujitsu Jessa Khan and Amanda Alequin was scheduled to take place at the event. However, Alequin withdraw due to undisclosed medical issue.

A Heavyweight bout between Anderson Silva and Mikhail Jamal Abdul-Latif was scheduled to take place at the event. However, Abdul-Latif withdrawal due to suffered an injury.

A respective bouts of a South African and formerly undefeated 
MMA superstar Bokang Masunyane and a Japanese MMA phenom Hiroba Minowa, Filipino-American Lea Bivins for a promotional newcomer and an Indian star Zeba Bano were scratched their line-up due to Masunyane and Bano have been missed weight, and also Minowa rejected to negotiate for a catchweight bout against Masunyane
 
Bonus awards:

The following fighters were awarded bonuses:

$50,000 Performance of the Night: Sinsamut Klinmee, Danial Williams, Reinier de Ridder

Results

Road to ONE: Thailand 1

Road to ONE: Thailand 1 was a Combat sport event held by ONE Championship in partnership with Fairtex Fight Promotion on August 6, 2022, at the Lumpinee Boxing Stadium in Bangkok, Thailand.

Background
The event featured first part of the featherweight, flyweight and women's atomweight Road to ONE Muay Thai tournaments, with the champion receiving a US$100,000 contract to compete in ONE Championship.

Results

Road to ONE: Thailand 2

Road to ONE: Thailand 2 was a Combat sport event held by ONE Championship in partnership with Fairtex Fight Promotion on August 13, 2022, at the Lumpinee Boxing Stadium in Bangkok, Thailand.

Background
The event Week 2 of the featherweight, flyweight and women's atomweight Road to ONE Muay Thai tournaments, with the champion receiving a US$100,000 contract to compete in ONE Championship.

Results

ONE 160: Ok vs. Lee 2

ONE Championship 160: Ok vs. Lee 2 was a Combat sport event held by ONE Championship on August 26, 2022, at the Singapore Indoor Stadium in Kallang, Singapore.

Background
The main event of the evening featured a rematch for the ONE Lightweight Championship between the defending champion Ok Rae Yoon and the former champion Christian Lee.

A ONE Featherweight Championship bout between current champion Thanh Le and Tang Kai is expected to co-headline the event.

The event featured a semi-final of the ONE Muay Thai Flyweight Grand Prix between Walter Goncalves and Superlek Kiatmoo9, as well as one Grand Prix alternate bout.

Results

ONE on Prime Video 1: Moraes vs. Johnson 2

ONE on Prime Video 1: Moraes vs. Johnson 2 (also known as ONE Fight Night 1 outside the Americas) was a Combat sport event held by ONE Championship on August 27, 2022, at the Singapore Indoor Stadium in Kallang, Singapore.

Background
This was the card for ONE Championship debut to air on Amazon Prime Video.

A ONE Flyweight Championship rematch between current champion Adriano Moraes and former UFC Flyweight Champion (also 2019 ONE Flyweight World Grand Prix Champion) Demetrious Johnson is expected to headline the event. The pairing previously met at ONE on TNT 1 in April 2021 where Moraes defeated Johnson by Knockout in Round 2.

The co-main event of the evening featured a title fight for the ONE Muay Thai Bantamweight Championship between the champion Nong-O Gaiyanghadao and the challenger Liam Harrison.

The event was to feature a semi-final of the ONE Flyweight Muay Thai World Grand Prix between current ONE Flyweight Muay Thai World Champion Rodtang Jitmuangnon and Savvas Michael with the winner advancing to the World Grand Prix final. However, Rodtang was forced to withdraw due to failed to provide a sample for the organization’s mandatory hydration test and was not permitted to weigh in and was replaced by Panpayak Jitmuangnon who scheduled against Sherzod Kabutov in preliminary card.

A Flyweight Muay Thai bout between former ONE Flyweight Muay Thai World Champion Jonathan Haggerty and Amir Naseri was expected to take place at the event. However, Haggerty forced to withdraw from the contest due to a non-COVID related illness.

At the weigh-ins, two fighters missed weight for their respective bouts. Itsuki Hirata weighed in at 119.25 pounds, 4.25 lbs over the Atomweight non-title fight limit. Zebaztian Kadestam weighed in at 188.5 pounds, 3.5 lbs over the welterweight non-title fight limit. Both bouts proceeded at catchweight. Kadestam was fined 30% of their purse, which went to their opponent Iuri Lapicus; Hirata was fined 50% of their purse, which went to their opponent Lin Heqin.

Results

Road to ONE: Muay Thai Grand Prix Liverpool

Road to ONE: Muay Thai Grand Prix Liverpool was a Muay Thai event held by ONE Championship in partnership with Muay Thai Grand Prix on September 10, 2022, at the Eventim Olympia in Liverpool, England.

Background
The event featured first part of an eight man tournament for the Road to ONE Muay Thai Grand Prix Bantamweight tournament, with the champion receiving a US$100,000 contract to compete in ONE Championship.

Results

Road to ONE: Thailand 3

Road to ONE: Thailand 3 was a Combat sport event held by ONE Championship in partnership with Fairtex Fight Promotion on September 17, 2022, at the Lumpinee Boxing Stadium in Bangkok, Thailand.

Background
The event featured semi-final of the featherweight, flyweight and women's atomweight Road to ONE Muay Thai tournaments, with the champion receiving a US$100,000 contract to compete in ONE Championship.

A tournament Featherweight Muay Thai bout between Yodphupha Tor. Yotha and YodIQ P.K.Saenchai Muaythaigym was scheduled take place at the event. However, YodIQ withdraw due to flu symptoms and was replaced by Kwangtung Realfighter.

Results

ONE 161: Petchmorakot vs. Tawanchai 

ONE 161: Petchmorakot vs. Tawanchai  was a Combat sport event held by ONE Championship on September 29, 2022, at the Singapore Indoor Stadium in Kallang, Singapore.

Background
A ONE Heavyweight World Championship title unification bout between current champion Arjan Bhullar and interim champion Anatoly Malykhin is expected to headline the event. However, Bhullar withdraws their title unification bout with Malykhin due to his arm injury.

A ONE Muay Thai Featherweight Championship bout between current champion Petchmorakot Petchyindee and #1 ranked contender Tawanchai P.K.Saenchai is expected that this event.

The event will also feature the semi-finals of the ONE Heavyweight Kickboxing World Grand Prix.

At the weigh-ins, Han Zihao weighed in at 154.75 lb, 8.75 lb over the bantamweight non-title fight limit of 145 pounds. the bout agreed to moved to the featherweight division (145–155 lbs) where Han was fined 30%, which went to Ferrari Fairtex. Wang Shuo came in at 139.5 pounds, 3.5 pounds over the flyweight non-title limit. The bout was later scrapped after Wang Shuo pulled out of the bout.

Fight card

ONE on Prime Video 2: Xiong vs. Lee 3

ONE on Prime Video 2: Lee vs. Xiong 3 (also known as ONE Fight Night 2 outside the Americas) was a Combat sport event held by ONE Championship on September 30, 2022, at the Singapore Indoor Stadium in Kallang, Singapore.

Background
A ONE Women's Strawweight Championship bout and trilogy between current champion Xiong Jingnan and current ONE Women's Atomweight Champion Angela Lee headlined the event. The pairing first met at ONE: A New Era on March 31, 2019 where Xiong won by knockout in fifth round. Their second meeting took place at ONE: Century on October 13, 2019 in ONE Women's Atomweight World Championship bout, where Lee defended the title by submission in fifth round.

A ONE Featherweight Kickboxing World Championship bout between current champion Superbon Singha Mawynn and former K-1 Super Welterweight Champion (also 2022 ONE Featherweight Kickboxing World Grand Prix Champion) Chingiz Allazov is expected to take place at the co-main event.

A inaugural ONE Flyweight Submission Grappling World Championship bout between Mikey Musumeci and Cleber Sousa was expected to take place at the event. It was also the submission grappling title in the promotion's history.

Fight card

Road to ONE: Muay Thai Grand Prix Sheffield

Road to ONE: Muay Thai Grand Prix Sheffield was a Combat sport event held by ONE Championship in partnership with Muay Thai Grand Prix on October 1, 2022, at the Magna Centre in Sheffield, England.

Background
The event featured second part of an eight man tournament for the Road to ONE Muay Thai Grand Prix Bantamweight tournament, with the champion receiving a US$100,000 contract to compete in ONE Championship.

Results

Road to ONE: BEAST Championship 11

Road to ONE: BEAST Championship 11 was a Combat sport event held by ONE Championship in partnership with BEAST Championship on October 8, 2022, at the Gladstone Showground in Gladstone, Australia.

Background
The event featured a four man tournament for the Road to ONE BEAST Championship Light Heavyweight tournament, with the champion receiving a US$100,000 contract to compete in ONE Championship.

Participant:
  Priscus Fogagnolo
  Lyle Karam
  Isi Fitikefu
  Harry Grech

Fight Card

ONE 162: Zhang vs. Di Bella

ONE 162: Zhang vs. Di Bella was a Combat sport event held by ONE Championship on October 21, 2022 at the Axiata Arena in Kuala Lumpur, Malaysia

Background
The event was headlined by a vacant ONE Kickboxing Strawweight Championship bout between Zhang Peimian and promotional newcomer Jonathan Di Bella. Di Bella defeated Zhang by unanimous decision for the ONE Kickboxing Strawweight Championship.

Fight card

ONE on Prime Video 3: Lineker vs. Andrade

ONE on Prime Video 3: Lineker vs Andrade (also known as ONE Fight Night 3 outside the Americas) was a Combat sport event held by ONE Championship on October 22, 2022 at the Axiata Arena in Kuala Lumpur, Malaysia.

Background
The main event featured ONE Middleweight Champion Reinier de Ridder defending his title against promotional newcomer Shamil Abdulaev.

The event will mark the promotion's return to Kuala Lumpur, Malaysia for the first time since ONE Championship 105: Mark Of Greatness in December 2019.
Three championship belts were on the line during this event, namely the ONE Bantamweight Championship, the inaugural ONE Lightweight Submission Grappling Championship and the inaugural ONE Lightweight Muay Thai Championship.

Kade Ruotolo defeated Uali Kurzhev via heel hook to capture the ONE Lightweight Submission Grappling Championship, Regian 'The Immortal' Eersel defeated Sinsamut Klinmee via split decision to capture the ONE Lightweight Muay Thai Championship and the bout between John Lineker and Fabricio Andrade was declared a no contest after Lineker received an unintentional groin strike, leaving the ONE Bantamweight title vacant.

Fight card

Road to ONE: Thailand 4

Road to ONE: Thailand 4 was a Combat sport event held by ONE Championship in partnership with Fairtex Fight Promotion on October 29, 2022, at the Lumpinee Boxing Stadium in Bangkok, Thailand.

Background
The event featured final of the featherweight, flyweight and women's atomweight Road to ONE Muay Thai tournaments, with the champion receiving a US$100,000 contract to compete in ONE Championship.

Results

Road to ONE: Muay Thai Grand Prix London

Road to ONE: Muay Thai Grand Prix London was a Combat sport event held by ONE Championship in partnership with Muay Thai Grand Prix on November 12, 2022, at the Peninsula Square in London, England.

Background
The event featured the semi-finals of an eight man tournament for the Road to ONE Muay Thai Grand Prix Bantamweight tournament, with the champion receiving a US$100,000 contract to compete in ONE Championship.

Results

ONE on Prime Video 4: Abbasov vs. Lee

ONE on Prime Video 4: Abbasov vs. Lee (also known as ONE Fight Night 4) was a Combat sport event held by ONE Championship on November 19, 2022 at the Singapore Indoor Stadium in Kallang, Singapore.

Background
The competition was announced bout couple between former ONE Middleweight and Light Heavyweight World Champion Aung La Nsang and former UFC and WSOF Middleweight title contender Yushin Okami. However their fight was moved to ONE 163 on the same day.

Fight card

ONE 163: Akimoto vs. Petchtanong

ONE 163: Akimoto vs. Petchtanong will be a Combat sport event held by ONE Championship on November 19, 2022 at the Singapore in Kallang, Singapore.

Background
The main event will feature ONE Bantamweight Kickboxing Champion Hiroki Akimoto defending his title against Petchtanong Petchfergus.

Fight card

ONE on Prime Video 5: de Ridder vs. Malykhin

ONE on Prime Video 5: de Ridder vs. Malylhin (also known as ONE Fight Night 5) will be a Combat sport event held by ONE Championship on December 3, 2022 at the Mall of Asia Arena in Manila, Philippines.

Background
ONE Light Heavyweight World Champion (and also the ONE Middleweight World Champion) Reinier de Ridder is set to make his first title defense against interim ONE Heavyweight World Champion Anatoliy Malykhin in the main event.

A welterweight bout between promotional newcomer and former KSW Champion Roberto Soldić and Murad Ramazanov was announced for the event.

Fight card

ONE 164: Pacio vs. Brooks

ONE 164: Pacio vs. Brooks will be a Combat sport event held by ONE Championship on December 3, 2022 at the Mall of Asia Arena in Manila, Philippines.

Background
A ONE Strawweight World Championship title bout between current champion Joshua Pacio and the contender Jarred Brooks is expected to headline the event.

The event will mark the promotion's return to Manila, Philippines for the first time since ONE Championship 107: Fire & Fury in January 2020.

Fight card

See also
 List of current ONE fighters
 2022 in UFC
 2022 in Bellator MMA
 2022 in Absolute Championship Akhmat
 2022 in Konfrontacja Sztuk Walki
 2022 in Rizin Fighting Federation
 2022 in AMC Fight Nights 
 2022 in Brave Combat Federation
 2022 in Road FC
 2022 Professional Fighters League season
 2022 in Eagle Fighting Championship
 2022 in Legacy Fighting Alliance
 2022 in Glory
 2022 in K-1 
 2022 in Romanian kickboxing
 2022 in Wu Lin Feng

References

External links
ONE Championship

ONE Championship events
ONE Championship events
2022 sport-related lists
ONE
ONE